The Public Execution of Mister Personality / Quasi Day Room: Live at the Moore Theatre is a 2006 double album by Boulder, Colorado-based avant-rock, experimental and folk jazz music group Hamster Theatre, led by Dave Willey. It was released in the United States by Cuneiform Records, and consists of a studio CD (The Public Execution of Mister Personality) and a live CD (Quasi Day Room: Live at the Moore Theatre), the latter recorded at the 2002 Progman Cometh Festival in Seattle, Washington.

The studio disc contains new material, while the live disc includes music from Hamster Theatre's earlier albums, Carnival Detournement and Siege on Hamburger City, and Willey's solo album, Songs from the Hamster Theatre. Both CDs were mixed and mastered by Bob Drake.

Reception

John Kelman wrote at All About Jazz that on this album, Hamster Theatre does more than "dissolv[e] artificial boundaries between musical styles", they "just plain nuke them". He said they make liberal use of counterpoint, and their music "is a complex intertwining of themes and influences", including Swedish accordionist Lars Hollmer, Erik Satie, Captain Beefheart, Frank Zappa and RIO groups Henry Cow and Univers Zero. Kelman described the album as "a challenging but evocative and completely enthralling listen".

In a review at AllMusic, Dave Lynch called the album "a landmark two-disc studio/live set proving that the European RIO-based sounds of the '70s and '80s have taken root and can sprout up almost anywhere, even in the post-millennial Rocky Mountain State". He said the music has "the complexity and technical skill of prog rock and includes occasional startling intrusions of abrasive textures and experimental noise", but added that Willey's accordion introduces "an appealing European folk melodicism mixed with a classicist's sense of composition".

A reviewer at Musique Machine described the album as "thoroughly entertaining", and added that the tracks on the studio disc "reveal an imaginative mind" with "a strong theatrical aspect", while the live disc is "energetic" and "shed[s] a different light" on the studio set.

Track listing
All tracks by Dave Willey, except where noted.

Source: AllMusic, Discogs.

Personnel
Dave Willey – accordion, bass guitar, bells, cymbals, drums, guitar, guitarron, handclapping, harmonium, keyboards, organ, percussion, piano, electric piano, prepared piano, shaker, ukulele, violin, vocals, whistling
Jon Stubbs – bass guitar, glockenspiel, keyboards, percussion, trombone
Mike Johnson – guitar, lap steel guitar, mandolin, banjo, fretless banjo, percussion
Mark Harris – clarinet, bass clarinet, flute, reeds, saxophone, percussion, vocals
Raoul Rossiter – drums, marimba, percussion
Matt Spencer – bass guitar (CD 1)
Brian McDougall – bass guitar (CD 2)
Emily Bowman – viola (CD 1)
Source: AllMusic, Discogs.

Recording notes
CD 1 recorded at The Tar Paper Shack, The Rendezvous, The Detroiter, Stubbsonic, Mike's Dank Cellar, September School, Alexander Dawson School and Brave New Audio
CD 2 recorded live at The Moore Theatre/Progman Cometh Festival, August 2002, Seattle, Washington
Dave Willey – engineer
Jon Stubbs – engineer
Mike Johnson – engineer
Mark McCoin – engineer
Brian McDougall – engineer
Bob Drake – mixing, mastering
Source: AllMusic.

References

External links
The Public Execution of Mister Personality / Quasi Day Room: Live at the Moore Theatre at Cuneiform Records

2006 albums
2006 live albums
Experimental music albums by American artists
Cuneiform Records albums
Cuneiform Records live albums